Japanese band Babymetal has embarked on five headlining tours, in addition to performing at various other one-off shows, award ceremonies, and television shows. Babymetal originated as a sub-unit of the Japanese idol group Sakura Gakuin in 2010, and first promoted their first singles as part of the group at their various concerts in Japan. For the first three years, the band performed as a sub-unit of the main group called jūon-bu (heavy music club).

Many of the band's performances are connected together within the band's lore, called the Metal Resistance. In 2012 and 2013, the band performed in a series of shows, accompanying the release of their major label singles "Ijime, Dame, Zettai" and "Megitsune". Following the release of their debut album Babymetal in 2014, as well as their viral success from their music videos, especially of the song "Gimme Chocolate!!", the band began their first headlining tour, the Babymetal World Tour 2014, which began in April 2014 and ended in December 2014, with performances in Europe, North America, and Japan. The following year, the band headlined another one-off show in Saitama, Japan and embarked on their second world tour, the Babymetal World Tour 2015, coinciding with the band's rerelease of Babymetal (2014) internationally.

To promote the band's second studio album Metal Resistance (2016), Babymetal began the Babymetal World Tour 2016: Legend Metal Resistance, which began with a headlining show at the Wembley Arena in April 2016 and ended with two shows at the Tokyo Dome in September 2016. Critics praised the vocal performance of the singers, as well as the instrumental performance of the supporting Kami Band. Following the conclusion of the show, the band toured around the United States, serving as an opening act for the bands Red Hot Chili Peppers, Metallica, Guns N' Roses, Korn, and Stone Sour from December 2016 to June 2017. Afterward, the band returned to Japan and performed a series of shows in The Five Fox Festival in Japan tour, and finishing the year with a pair of headlining shows in Hiroshima to commemorate the twentieth birthday of lead singer Suzuka Nakamoto. Yui Mizuno did not perform from that show onwards, and with Babymetal embarking on their Babymetal World Tour 2018 in May 2018, she eventually left the group officially.

Concert tours

Promotional concerts

Headlining shows
Shows that are performed during concert tours are not listed.

Performances at festival concerts
Shows that are performed during concert tours are not listed.

Performances at Sakura Gakuin shows

Performances at award shows

Performances at television shows and specials

Other shows

References

External links
 Tours of Babymetal at Live Nation

Babymetal concert tours
Babymetal